The Invisible Gorilla is a book published in 2010, co-authored by Christopher Chabris and Daniel Simons. This title of this book refers to an earlier research project by Chabris and Simons revealing that people who are focused on one thing can easily overlook something else. To demonstrate this effect they created a video where students pass a basketball between themselves. Viewers asked to count the number of times the players with the white shirts pass the ball often fail to notice a person in a gorilla suit who appears in the center of the image (see Invisible Gorilla test), an experiment described as "one of the most famous psychological demos ever". Simons and Chabris were awarded an Ig Nobel Prize for the Invisible Gorilla experiment.

See also
Attention
Attentional control
Change blindness
Inattentional blindness

References

External links

2010 non-fiction books
Collaborative non-fiction books